Dusk to Dawn is a 1922 American silent drama film directed by King Vidor. It is unknown whether any recording of the film survives; it may be a lost film.

Plot
An Indian maid and American girl (both played by Florence Vidor) share a single soul which shifts between them each day when they are awake.

Cast
 Florence Vidor as Marjorie Latham / Aziza
 Jack Mulhall as Philip Randall
 Truman Van Dyke as Ralph Latham
 James Neill as John Latham
 Lydia Knott as Mrs. Latham
 Herbert Fortier as Mark Randall
 Norris Johnson as Babette
 Nellie Anderson as Marua
 Sidney Franklin as Nadar Gungi
 Peter Burke as Itjah Nyhal Singh

Production
Dusk to Dawn would mark the final professional collaboration between King Vidor and Florence Vidor. By the early 1920s, Florence Vidor had emerged as a major film star in her own right and wished to pursue her career independently of her spouse. The couple divorced in 1926, and shortly thereafter Florence married violinist Jascha Heifetz

Theme
Based on a novel The Shuttle Soul by Katherine Hill, the story dramatizes the far Eastern concepts of “migrating souls” advanced by Theopism popular in the United States during the 1920s. Vidor may have identified with Theophist methods of faith healing that were compatible with his Christian Science principles, encouraging positive thinking over medical interventions.

Footnotes

References
Baxter, John. 1976. King Vidor. Simon & Schuster, Inc. Monarch Film Studies. LOC Card Number 75-23544.
Durgnat, Raymond and Simmon, Scott. 1988. King Vidor, American. University of California Press, Berkeley.

External links

1922 films
1922 drama films
Silent American drama films
American silent feature films
American black-and-white films
Films directed by King Vidor
Associated Exhibitors films
1920s American films
1920s English-language films